The 1931 Arkansas Razorbacks football team represented the University of Arkansas in the Southwest Conference (SWC) during the 1931 college football season. In their third year under head coach Fred Thomsen, the Razorbacks compiled a 3–5–1 record (0–4 against SWC opponents), finished in last place in the SWC, and were outscored by their opponents by a combined total of 126 to 82.

Schedule

References

Arkansas
Arkansas Razorbacks football seasons
Arkansas Razorbacks football